Musculium lacustre is a species of small freshwater clam, an aquatic bivalve mollusc in the family Sphaeriidae, the fingernail clams and pea clams.

Description
The 8–11 mm. shell is oval to quadrangular in shape. The umbos which are capped by the juvenile shell are slightly in front of middle directed forwards. The posterior end is broad and truncated. The shell is fragile, fairly glossy and pearl grey to white in colour. The periostracum (surface) is ornamented with fine, even, concentric striation.

Distribution
The native distribution of this species is Holarctic and occurs in islands and countries including:
 Algeria
 Belgium
 Czech Republic – in Bohemia, in Moravia, near threatened (NT)
 Slovakia
 Germany – (Arten der Vorwarnliste)
 Great Britain
 Ireland
 Nordic countries: Denmark, Finland, Sweden (but not in Faroes nor in Iceland)

References

External links
Musculium lacustre at Animalbase taxonomy,short description, biology,status (threats), images

Sphaeriidae
Molluscs described in 1774
Taxa named by Otto Friedrich Müller